The Croatian Journalists' Association ( or HND) is a Croatian association based in Zagreb aimed at promoting freedom of the press and free speech in journalism.

The association was founded in December 1910 and has over 3,000 members. It arranges debates on current topics and hands out annual prizes for excellence in journalism. The association is a member of the International Federation of Journalists since 1992.

On 2 July 2015 was founded second "Croatian Journalists and Publicists" (HNiP) association after a group of journalists and publicists perceived there were gross irregularities in the elections of a branch on Croatian Radiotelevision (HRT).

See also 
 Media of Croatia#Trade unions

References

External links 
 Official site 

Organizations established in 1910
Croatian journalism organizations